The Manhattan Rebellion was a failed coup attempt by officers of the Royal Thai Navy against the government of Prime Minister Plaek Pibulsonggram (Phibun) on 29–30 June 1951. They took the prime minister hostage during a handover ceremony for the US dredge Manhattan and brought him aboard the Navy's flagship HTMS Sri Ayudhya. However, they were met by the combined forces of the Royal Thai Army, Air Force and Police. Heavy fighting ensued, and Sri Ayudhya was sunk despite Phibun's presence on board; the prime minister had to swim ashore along with the ship's crew. The event led to the Navy being stripped of most of its power and influence. It also showed that political power actually lay with commanders of the Armed Forces rather than the prime minister.

Events
On 29 June 1951, a group of junior naval officers seized Phibun at gunpoint while he was attending the transfer ceremony of the US Navy dredge Manhattan to the Thai navy at Ratchaworadit Pier on the Chao Phraya River in Bangkok. Phibun was forcibly taken aboard the Thai navy flagship HTMS Sri Ayudhya and held hostage. General stations were called, and the ship began to make way downstream towards the Naval Ordnance Department in Bang Na.
However, the coup plotters failed to secure the opening of the Memorial Bridge, so the warship could not continue downstream. Fighting quickly ensued, and the naval units that sided with the rebels became heavily outnumbered by the army, police and air force, who were loyal to the government. Fighting subsided during the night of 29 June, but resumed and intensified early the next morning. Sri Ayudhya joined the fight, but its engines were soon disabled and the ship became dead in the water in front of Wichaiprasit Fort. It was heavily fired upon from the eastern bank by guns and mortars, and, by afternoon, was also bombarded by AT-6 trainer planes. Heavy fires broke out, and the order was given to abandon ship. Phibun had to swim ashore along with the sailors, but was uninjured. The fires continued throughout the night and into the next day, when fighting ceased. The heavily damaged Sri Ayudhya finally sank on the night of 1 July. The struggle led to the deaths of 17 military personnel, eight police officers, and 103 civilians. More than 500 people were wounded. Property damage amounted to 15 million baht and the loss of the navy's most powerful warship. According to New York Times, there were 68 deaths.

In the aftermath, the navy's leadership was immediately fired, including Admiral Sindhu, its top commander. Seventy other officers were relieved of duty. More than 1,300 sailors suspected of joining or aiding the rebellion were arrested. All naval combat aircraft were handed over to the air force. Heavy naval weapons were confiscated. Naval bases in Bangkok were relocated to outer provinces such as Chonburi and Samut Prakan. The Thai Marines was downsized and placed under army command. The naval submarine fleet was decommissioned.

The wreck of Sri Ayudhya was later salvaged for scrap, as it had become a navigational hazard. The ship was officially struck from the naval register on 8 October 1959 in Ministerial Order 350/21315.

References

Bibliography

 

Attempted coups in Thailand
Conflicts in 1951
1951 in Thailand
Thailand
Naval battles involving Thailand
June 1951 events in Asia